Şükrü Koçak (1886, Elazığ, Ottoman Empire – 1961, Ankara, Turkey) was a Turkish career officer, government minister, politician, and ideologue of the Kemalist doctrine.

Biography 
He graduated from the Military Academy. Between 1939 and 1947 he was the Chairman of the Turkish Aeronautical Association. Between 1 November to 7 December 1944, he took part in the delegation representing Turkey at the International Civil Aviation Conference held in Chicago.

He was made the Minister of Transport and worked with the Recep Peker and Hasan Saka governments. He was married and had two children.

References

1886 births
1961 deaths
People from Elazığ
Republican People's Party (Turkey) politicians